Bitter Flowers is a 2017 internationally co-produced drama film directed by Olivier Meys in his directorial debut. It was written by Meys with Maarten Loix. The film had its world premiere at the 22nd Busan International Film Festival. It was later screened at the Chicago International Film Festival and the Palm Springs International Film Festival before its theatrical release.

Bitter Flowers received four nominations at the 9th Magritte Awards, including Best Film and Best Director for Olivier Meys. It went on to win Best First Feature Film.

Accolades

References

External links
 

2017 films
2017 drama films
Belgian drama films
Chinese drama films
Chinese-language films
French drama films
2010s French-language films
Magritte Award winners
Swiss drama films
Films about prostitution in Paris
2017 directorial debut films
2010s French films